Počehova ( or ) is a settlement north of Maribor in northeastern Slovenia. It belongs to the City Municipality of Maribor.

References

External links
Počehova on Geopedia

Populated places in the City Municipality of Maribor